Williamsburg Technical College is a public community college in Kingstree, South Carolina.  It is a part of the South Carolina Technical College System.

External links
Official website

South Carolina Technical College System
Buildings and structures in Williamsburg County, South Carolina